Several rivers are named Santa Maria River.

Argentina
 Two rivers

Bolivia
 Crivers

Brazil
 Six rivers, including:
 Santa Maria River (Mato Grosso do Sul)
 Santa Maria River (Rio Grande do Sul)
 Santa Maria River (Sergipe)

Chile
 Two rivers

Colombia
 Two rivers

Cuba
 Five rivers

Italy
 One river

Mexico
 Seven rivers, including:
 Santa Maria River (Chihuahua)
 Santa Maria River (San Luis Potosi)

Panama
 Santa Maria River (Panama)

Peru
 Two rivers

Philippines
 Four rivers

Spain
 Two rivers

United States
 Santa Maria River (Arizona)
 Santa Maria River (California)

Venezuela
 Santa Maria River (Venezuela)